The Honourable Tania Rosamund Harcourt-Cooze (née Coleridge, born 22 January 1966) is an English model and actress.

Early life and education 
The daughter of Major William Duke Coleridge, 5th Baron Coleridge of Ottery St Mary, a Major in the Coldstream Guards, and his first wife Everild Tania Hambrough, she is directly related to the poet Samuel Taylor Coleridge. The oldest of five children, by her father's first marriage she has a brother, James Duke Coleridge (born 1967) and a sister, Sophia Tamsin Coleridge (born 1970).

Born in Kenya, she followed her father's British Army career until her parents divorced in 1977 when she was 11.  By his second marriage, she has two half-sisters, Vanessa Leyla Coleridge (born 1978) and Katharine Suzannah Coleridge (born 1981).

Career

Modelling 
She completed an art history and drama degree at Fine Arts College in London. She joined the punk rock revolution, and would hang out on the Kings Road, Chelsea.

She was spotted by Sarah Doukas, who dispatched her in 1986 to model for Armani and Versace in Italy, and she became a muse for Helmut Newton. She starred opposite the singer George Michael in the video for "Father Figure", inspired by Newton. She also appeared in the music video of the Kane Roberts song "Twisted" and she was the “power drill girl” in Van Halen's "Poundcake" video in 1991.

Management 
Returning to England in 2001, she took over the management of The Chanter's House, the family's ancestral home in March 2002. The couple set up events management company Kubla Khan, through which to organise weddings, fashion shoots, residential art courses, exhibitions, house tours and cultural gatherings based around the house.

In October 2006, the increasing costs of maintaining the property caused the family trust to put the property up for sale and auction the contents.

Media 
She came to public prominence again in 2008 with the airing of the fly-on-the-wall documentary, Willie's Wonky Chocolate Factory, centred on her husband's efforts to be one of the first Britons since the Cadbury family to grow, import and produce their own chocolate.

Personal life 
She married Willie Harcourt-Cooze, a Burmese-Irish man, in 1993 after meeting him in her late teens. Using the funds from the sale of his London flat and his family's money, the couple purchased a  cocoa farm, in the Venezuelan cloud forest, Hacienda El Tesoro in the Henri Pittier National Park, near Choroni Beach., and planted more than 50,000 Criollo cocoa trees.

She lives in Tiverton, Devon and has three children – Sophia, William and Eve 
In May 2010 she and her husband separated and they formalized a divorce in 2011.

See also 
 Baron Coleridge
 Ottery St Mary

References and footnotes

External links 
 

1966 births
Living people
English people of Kenyan descent
English female models
Daughters of barons
English film actresses
Tania